Paul Beisman (died October 1958) was an American theater manager. He was manager of the St. Louis, Missouri's Orpheum Theater. Beisman was honored with the Special Tony Award at the 2nd Tony Awards.

References

External links 

Year of birth missing
1958 deaths
American theatre managers and producers
Stage managers
American theatre people
Special Tony Award recipients